Tabaré Uruguay Viudez Mora (born 8 September 1989) is an Uruguayan footballer currently playing for C.A. Cerro.

Career

Defensor Sporting
Viudez, played for Uruguayan champions' (Defensor Sporting) senior team for one year in the 2007–08 season and scored 6 goals.

Milan
In the 2008 Off-Season transfer window, Tabare Viudez attracted the attention of Milan along with Mathias Cardacio. Both players signed for the club after undergoing trials. Tabare Viudez was to wear the number '20' shirt, previously worn by Yoann Gourcuff. The Fonseca Group, who have the rights of the player, led the negotiations to transfer Viudez to the San Siro for the upcoming Serie A 2008–09 season. The Montevideo-born player, was relishing the new chapter in his career. 'I cannot believe it. It's a terrific jump up in my career,' he said. 'I must confess I have mixed feelings - nervousness and joy. This is a big step forward for me.' It was not known yet whether Viudez was to play for the first-team, play for Milan's Primavera squad (Under-20) or go out on loan for the season.

Viudez made several pre-season appearances for Milan. After coming on as a substitute at the half for Alberto Paloschi against Manchester City, Ancelotti praised his movement and pace after the match declaring him a player that can be relied on in the future, despite the narrow 1–0 loss. Viudez made his competitive debut in the Serie A coming on as a late substitute for David Beckham in a 3–0 win over Atalanta on 8 March 2009. This was also his only competitive match in Milan. And he was on the pitch for just 7 seconds before the final whistle, without touching the ball.

Return to Defensor Sporting
On 28 August 2009 Milan announced to have released Viudez (and fellow Uruguayan Mathías Cardacio) by mutual consent: he was later signed by his former club Defensor Sporting.

Necaxa
In 2010, he was bought from Mexican giants Club América to play for the next four seasons. He was loaned out to Necaxa.

Nacional
In December 2010 Viudez signed for Club Nacional de Football facing the 2010-11 season's Torneo Clausura. After Nacional won the Clausura Viudez scored the only goal in the season's final game against Defensor Sporting.
He was also a key player for Nacional to win the next season's championship.

Club Atlético River Plate
His first appearance with River Plate was in the semi-finals of Copa Libertadores 2015 against Guarani (Paraguay). Viudez came in the second half of the game. He assists for an important goal for the game, making River Plate advance to the Final Championship phase. The first leg, in Mexico, he was injured and missed the second leg of the Championship game of Copa Libertadores in Buenos Aires.

His first goal came in the first appearance in the Argentina's Primera División against C.A. Colón in the second half. This game ended in a victory of River Plate 3–1, putting River Plate momentarily on top of the Argentina Primera División Championship 2015: Julio Humberto Grondona Trophy.

River Plate beat Tigres (Mex.) and won their 3rd Copa Libertadores title in 2015. A day after the victory, he traveled with the team to Japan to play against Gamba Osaka, in The Suruga Bank Cup 2015.

International career 
Viudez was part of Uruguay's 2007 FIFA U-20 World Cup squad and was the youngest player representing them. In January 2009, Viudez joined up with Uruguay's 2009 South American Youth Championship in Venezuela. He played the first match in Uruguay's 2–0 victory over Bolivia and provided an impressive assist for the first goal to Nicolás Lodeiro. In the side's second match, Viudez scored a goal in the first minute in the side's 3–2 victory over Chile.  He was part of Uruguay's team at the 2012 Summer Olympics.

Honours

Defensor Sporting
 Uruguayan League (1): 2007–08

Nacional
 Uruguayan League (2): 2010-11, 2011-12

Olimpia Asunción
Paraguayan League (3),2019 Apertura, 2019 Clausura, 2020 Clausura

References

External links

1989 births
Living people
Uruguayan footballers
Uruguayan expatriate footballers
Association football midfielders
Footballers at the 2011 Pan American Games
Footballers at the 2012 Summer Olympics
Olympic footballers of Uruguay
Uruguay youth international footballers
Uruguay under-20 international footballers
Pan American Games medalists in football
Pan American Games bronze medalists for Uruguay
Medalists at the 2011 Pan American Games
Defensor Sporting players
Club Nacional de Football players
A.C. Milan players
Kasımpaşa S.K. footballers
Club América footballers
Club Necaxa footballers
Club Atlético River Plate footballers
Club Olimpia footballers
C.A. Rentistas players
C.A. Cerro players
Uruguayan Primera División players
Argentine Primera División players
Paraguayan Primera División players
Liga MX players
Serie A players
Süper Lig players
Uruguayan expatriate sportspeople in Argentina
Uruguayan expatriate sportspeople in Mexico
Uruguayan expatriate sportspeople in Italy
Uruguayan expatriate sportspeople in Turkey
Uruguayan expatriate sportspeople in Paraguay
Expatriate footballers in Argentina
Expatriate footballers in Mexico
Expatriate footballers in Italy
Expatriate footballers in Turkey
Expatriate footballers in Paraguay